The Los Bracitos tree frog (Boana heilprini), or Hispaniolan green treefrog, is a species of frog in the family Hylidae  endemic to Hispaniola and found below  asl. The species was named in honour of professor Angelo Heilprin who funded the expedition that this species was discovered on.

Natural habitats of Boana heilprini are mountain streams associated with mesic broadleaf forests. It can also be found in various modified habitats, such as cacao and coffee plantations, pastures, crop agriculture areas, and areas with livestock or forestry activities. Nevertheless, it seems to require pockets of forest habitat to persist in a landscape. It is threatened by habitat loss associated with agricultural activities, logging and charcoaling, as well as mining and infrastructure development.

References

Boana
Endemic fauna of Hispaniola
Amphibians of the Dominican Republic
Amphibians of Haiti
Amphibians described in 1923
Taxa named by Gladwyn Kingsley Noble
Taxonomy articles created by Polbot